is a Japanese storyboard artist and director. He is best known for directing the anime series  Elfen Lied, Sound of the Sky, and Kimi to Boku.

Filmography 
 Nausicaä of the Valley of Wind (1984) Production Manager 
 Ninja Ryukenden (1991) Director
 Nana Toshi Monogatari (1994) Director
 Psycho Diver: Soul Siren (1995) Director, Storyboard
 Harimogu Harley (1996) Director
 Cardcaptor Sakura (1998-2000) Storyboard (eps. 5, 9, 12, 16, 19, 21, 25, 28, 30, 33, 37, 41, 44), Episode Director (eps. 5, 9, 12, 16, 19, 21, 25, 28, 30, 33, 37, 41, 44, 48)
NieA_7 (2000) Storyboard (eps. 8, 12), Episode Director (eps. 3, 8)
 Princess Comet (2001-2002) Director
 Machine Robo Rescue (2003-2004) Director, Storyboard (eps. 1–2, 8, 51), Episode Director (eps. 1, 51)
 Elfen Lied (2004) Director, Storyboard (OP; eps. 1, 13), Episode Director (eps. 1, 13)
 Panda-Z (2004) Director
 I"s Pure (2005) Director, Storyboard (OP; ep. 1)
 Demon Prince Enma (2006-2007) Director
Baccano! (2007) Storyboard (eps. 6–7, 11, 15), Episode Director (eps. 6, 11, 15)
 Tegami Bachi: Hikari to Ao no Gensou Yawa (2008) Director
 Denpa teki na Kanojo (2009) Director, Storyboard
 Sound of the Sky (2010) Director, Storyboard (OP; eps. 1–2, 12–13), Episode Director (OP; eps. 1, 12–13)
 Kimi to Boku (2011) Director
 Kimi to Boku 2 (2012) Director
 Hanayamata (2014) Storyboard (eps. 1–2) 
 Subete ga F ni Naru (2015) Director, Storyboard (eps. 1–2, 7, 11), Episode Director (ep. 11)
 A Place Further than the Universe (2018) Storyboard (eps. 4, 7–8)
 The Promised Neverland (2019–2021) Director
 Ninjala (2022) Director

References

External links

1962 births
Topcraft
Living people